West Branch Neshaminy Creek is one of two branches of the Neshaminy Creek, the other being the North Branch, part of the Delaware River watershed. It is located in Bucks and Montgomery Counties in Pennsylvania.

Course
The West Branch drains .

Named tributaries
 Reading Creek

Municipalities
 Bucks County
 Chalfont Borough
 New Britain Township
 Montgomery County
 Hatfield Township
 Hatfield Borough
 Franconia Township

Bridges

See also
 List of rivers of Pennsylvania
 List of rivers of the United States
 List of Delaware River tributaries

References

Rivers of Bucks County, Pennsylvania
Tributaries of the Neshaminy Creek